Morphett Vale is a closed railway station in Adelaide, South Australia.
A station master was appointed in 1915 but it was an unattended crossing station since 1957. Facilities were available for the handling of casks of wine, as this area was mainly covered in vineyards.

It is now disused, the entire Willunga railway line having been dismantled in 1972 and now replaced by the Coast to Vines Rail Trail.

References

Australian Railway Historical Society Bulletin No 336, October 1965

External links
Last train through Morphett Vale before the line's closure, May 1969.
Railcar crossing over Bains Road, circa 1930
Aerial view of the Emu Winery, early 1950s.

Disused railway stations in South Australia